Elachista nitensella is a moth in the family Elachistidae. It was described by Sinev and Sruoga in 1995. It is found in Japan (Hokkaidô, Honsyû, Kyûsy) and the Russian Far East (Primorsky Kray).

Description
The length of the forewings is 2.9–3.7 mm for males and 3.6–3.7 mm for females. The forewings are blackish, slightly shiny and with gold-silvery markings. Adults have been recorded on wing from in July, probably in one generation per year.

Nutrition
The larvae feed on Carex species, possibly including Carex microtricha. They probably feed on the roots of their host plant.

References

Moths described in 1995
nitensella
Moths of Asia
Moths of Japan